Bruce Walsh may refer to:
 Bruce Walsh (playwright)
 Bruce Walsh (scientist)